Ma Jun (born 1953) is a Chinese historian and professor at the PLA National Defence University. He is vice president of the History Research Association of the Second World War in China, a member of the German History Research Association in China and a member of the History Branch of the Chinese History Association. He holds the rank of senior colonel in the People's Liberation Army (PLA).

Biography
Ma was born in Shenyang, Liaoning, China in 1953. During the Down to the Countryside Movement, he was a sent-down youth who worked in the fields instead of going to university.

After the resumption of college entrance examination, he was accepted to Northeast Normal University, earning a Bachelor of History degree. In 1982 he was assigned to Shenyang Artillery Academy, where he has successively served as a teacher, deputy company commander, company commander, etc. In 1985 he entered the PLA National Defence University, where he received his master's degree of military science. After graduation, he taught there. In 2000, he begin his education at Peking University, obtaining his degree of Doctor of Laws.

In 2006, Ma appeared on CCTV-10's Lecture Room programme.

Works

References

External links

1953 births
Writers from Shenyang
Living people
Northeast Normal University alumni
PLA National Defence University alumni
Peking University alumni
Academic staff of PLA National Defence University
Historians from Liaoning
Educators from Liaoning
People's Republic of China historians